The Government Degree College, Battagram also known as Degree College Battagram is a public sector degree college located in Battagram District of Khyber Pakhtunkhwa in Pakistan. It is affiliated with Hazara University for its degree programs while for its intermediate level programs, it is affiliated with Board of Intermediate and Secondary Education, Abbottabad.

History 
Government Degree College Battagram is situated in a valley of Chappargram adjacent to Karakoram Highway (Shahra-e-Resham, Silk Route). It is the only degree college for boys in Battagram District providing education both at Intermediate and degree level in Physical, Biological and Social Sciences. The college was established in 1999. The current campus was built with the assistance of Japan International Cooperation Agency (JICA) in 2009.

Location 
It is also located at a distance of about 1 km from the village Chappargram.

Departments and faculties 
The college currently have the following departments and faculties.

Faculty of Arts 
 Department of Economics
 Department of Health and Physical Education
 Department of History
 Department of Islamiyat
 Department of Law
 Department of Pashto
 Department of Political Science

Faculty of Science 
 Department of Biology
 Department of Chemistry
 Department of Mathematics
 Department of Physics
 Department of Statistics

Academic programs
The college offers bachelor's degrees in Arts and Science. Besides this it also provides specialisation in subject in both Science and Arts.

Intermediate 
 FA Arts/Humanities (2 Years)
 FSc PreEngineering (2 Years)
 FSc Pre Medical (2 Years)

Bachelor courses
 Bachelors in Arts
 Bachelors in Science (Medical)
 Bachelors in Science (Engineering)

See also 
 Hazara University
 Abbottabad University of Science and Technology
 University of Haripur
 Government Post Graduate College, Mansehra

References

External links 
 Government Degree College Battagram Official Website

Battagram District
Public universities and colleges in Khyber Pakhtunkhwa